Oliver Baumann (born 2 June 1990) is a German professional footballer who currently plays as a goalkeeper for Bundesliga club 1899 Hoffenheim.

Club career

SC Freiburg

Youth and B teams
Oliver Baumann joined SC Freiburg's youth team in 2002, since then he has gone on to make 104 Bundesliga appearances for the club. He made his youth team debut for Freiburg on 2 September 2007 at the age of 19. Two years later he made his first appearance for Freiburg's second string side SC Freiburg ll in the Regionalliga Süd against Stuttgarter Kickers, keeping a clean sheet in a 0–0 draw. He went on to make another 21 appearances for SC Freiburg.

First team
On the last day of the 2009–10 Bundesliga season, Baumann made his senior team debut in a 3–1 home victory over Borussia Dortmund. He became the SC Freiburg first-choice goalkeeper from the 2010–11 season onwards, where he made 30 appearances in the Bundesliga. In June 2011, he extended his contract until 2015. In the following two seasons, 2011–12 and 2012–13, Baumann made a total of 73 appearances for the Freiburg first-team, 67 of those in the league.

In the 2013–14 season he continued to be the mainstay of the Freiburg line-up, starting all of the club's first six Bundesliga fixtures, as well as starting Freiburg's opening UEFA Europa League and DFB-Pokal matches. In a match against Hamburg SV, Baumann made three terrible bloopers that led to a 3–0 loss to Hamburg SV. Despite his terrible performance, he started the following game against Nürnberg and kept a clean sheet to help Freiburg achieve its first win of the 2013/14 season. On 24 September 2013, Baumann signed a new contract at the club.

1899 Hoffenheim
On 14 May 2014, Baumann joined 1899 Hoffenheim on a four-year contract deal.

International career
Baumann is yet to make his senior team debut for Germany, but has made at least one appearance for all of the nation's youth sides from Under-18 level to Under-21 level. He made his one and only Germany U-18 appearance in a 2–3 friendly defeat to the Republic of Ireland in the under-18 side.

All four of Baumann's Under-19 appearances came in friendlies, most notable was a 5–0 home win against the Estonia U-19 side. After then making two appearances for Germany's U-20 side against the Switzerland Under-20s and Italy Under-20s, he made the step up to Under-21 level.

For the 2010–11 season, Baumann made four Germany U-21 friendly appearances, conceding six goals during those matches. Since that season, he has made just five Under-21 appearances in three seasons.  

Baumann was called up to the senior Germany squad for the UEFA Nations League matches against Spain and Switzerland in September 2020.

Career statistics

Club

References

External links
 
 

1990 births
Living people
People from Breisach
Sportspeople from Freiburg (region)
German footballers
Footballers from Baden-Württemberg
Germany under-21 international footballers
Germany youth international footballers
Association football goalkeepers
SC Freiburg players
TSG 1899 Hoffenheim players
Bundesliga players
21st-century German people